The Kuhn length is a theoretical treatment, developed by Hans Kuhn, in which a real polymer chain is considered as a collection of  Kuhn segments each with a Kuhn length . Each Kuhn segment can be thought of as if they are freely jointed with each other. Each segment in a freely jointed chain can randomly orient in any direction without the influence of any forces, independent of the directions taken by other segments. Instead of considering a real chain consisting of   bonds and with fixed bond angles, torsion angles, and bond lengths, Kuhn considered an equivalent ideal chain with  connected segments, now called Kuhn segments, that can orient in any random direction.

In the simplest treatment, such a chain follows the random walk model, where each step taken in a random direction is independent of the directions taken in the previous steps, forming a random coil.

Since the space occupied by a segment in the polymer chain cannot be taken by another segment, a self-avoiding random walk model can also be used. The Kuhn segment construction is useful in that it allows complicated polymers to be treated with simplified models as either a random walk or a self-avoiding walk, which can simplify the treatment considerably.

For an actual homopolymer chain (consists of the same repeat units) with bond length  and bond angle θ with a dihedral angle energy potential, the average end-to-end distance can be obtained as

,

where  is the average cosine of the dihedral angle.

The fully stretched length .

For worm-like chain, Kuhn length equals two times the persistence length.

References

Polymer chemistry
Polymer physics